Oleksandr Oleksandrovych Usyk (born 17 January 1987) is a Ukrainian professional boxer. He has held multiple world championships in two weight classes, including the unified WBA (Super), IBF, and WBO heavyweight titles since 2021, and the Ring magazine heavyweight title since 2022. Previously he held the undisputed cruiserweight championship from 2018 to 2019, being the first boxer in that division to hold all four major world titles.

Usyk is widely regarded as one of the greatest Ukrainian boxers of all time. With his victory over Anthony Joshua in 2021, Usyk became one of only three boxers to have unified the cruiserweight world titles and become a world heavyweight champion, joining Evander Holyfield and David Haye.

As an amateur, Usyk won heavyweight gold medals at the 2011 World Championships and 2012 Olympics. He turned professional in 2013 and won the undisputed cruiserweight championship in his 15th professional fight in 2018. Three of his titles were won during the inaugural World Boxing Super Series, in which he won the Muhammad Ali Trophy, as well as the Ring and lineal cruiserweight titles. For his achievements, Usyk was named the 2018 Fighter of the Year by Sports Illustrated, ESPN, The Ring and the Boxing Writers Association of America (BWAA).

In 2018 Usyk became the fourth male boxer in history to simultaneously hold the WBA, WBC, IBF and WBO titles, after Jermain Taylor, Bernard Hopkins and Terence Crawford. He was the first Ukrainian undisputed champion. He is particularly notable for the speed of his accomplishments, winning his first world title in his tenth fight, and becoming the undisputed champion of his weight class by his fifteenth fight. Usyk vacated his cruiserweight titles in 2019 to move up to heavyweight. By that point, in sixteen fights he had defeated five current or former world champions.

As of August 2022, Usyk is ranked as the world's best active boxer, pound for pound, by The Ring, second by the Transnational Boxing Rankings Board (TBRB), third by BWAA, fifth by BoxRec and sixth by ESPN. He is also ranked as the best heavyweight by TBRB, BoxRec and ESPN.

Early life
Usyk was born in Simferopol, Crimean Oblast, Ukrainian SSR, Soviet Union on 17 January 1987, to parents originally from northern Ukraine. His mother was born in the Chernihiv region (in the village of Rybotyn, Korop Raion), while his father was a native of Sumy. His mother worked in construction and moved to Simferopol to study. His father was a military man who passed through Afghanistan, working as a security guard in Crimea, and the two met there. He is the first born of his family and he has two siblings. Until age 15, he played football and was trained at the SC Tavriya Simferopol specialized sports school of Olympic reserve (club's football academy). In 2002 Usyk switched to boxing. He is a graduate of Lviv State University of Physical Culture.

Amateur career
At the 2006 European Championships he won his first three matches but lost in the semi-final to Matvey Korobov.

He then moved up to light-heavyweight later and won the Strandja Cup in 2008.

In February 2008, he moved up another weight class and was sent to the Olympic qualifier in Roseto degli Abruzzi replacing European Champion Denys Poyatsyka. There he defeated world class Azeri Elchin Alizade and Daniel Price.

At the 2008 Olympic Games, Usyk outpointed Yushan Nijiati by 23–4, but lost to Clemente Russo by 4–7 in the quarter-final.

He dropped down to light-heavyweight and won gold at the 2008 European Championships, but later moved back up to heavyweight. At the 2011 World Amateur Boxing Championships he defeated Artur Beterbiev and Teymur Mammadov to win the heavyweight title and qualify for the 2012 Summer Olympics.

At the 2012 Olympic Games in London, Usyk won the gold medal, outpointing Artur Beterbiev, Tervel Pulev and Italy's Clemente Russo, outscoring him by 6–3 in the final.

Usyk retired from amateur boxing with a record of 335−15.

Prior to turning professional, he competed in the heavyweight division (91+ kg) of the 2012–13 World Series of Boxing (WSB), as part of team Ukraine Otamans, winning all six of his bouts with two by stoppage (Junior Fa by UD, Eric Brechlin by 3rd round TKO, Joe Joyce by UD, Magomedrasul Majidov by UD, Matteo Modugno by 2nd round TKO and Mihai Nistor by UD).

Professional career

Early career
Usyk turned pro in late 2013 at the age of 26 and signed a promotional deal with the Klitschko brothers' K2 Promotions, fighting in the cruiserweight division.

On 9 November 2013 Usyk made his professional debut by defeating Mexican fighter Felipe Romero via a fifth-round knockout. The following month he stopped 38 year old Epifanio Mendoza in four rounds. In his third professional fight on 26 April 2014, Usyk made his debut in Germany on the undercard of Klitschko-Leapai at the Koenig Pilsener Arena, defeating Ben Nsafoah via third-round knockout. A month later, Usyk returned home and scored a fourth-round knockout-victory over Argentine Cesar David Crenz.

Rise up the ranks

Usyk won his first title on 4 October 2014, after beating South African boxer Daniel Bruwer via seventh-round technical knockout (TKO) for the interim WBO Inter-Continental cruiserweight title. Usyk defended the title two months later, stopping 35 year old Danie Venter in the ninth-round. Usyk was ahead on all three judges' scorecards at the time of stoppage.

Usyk made another defence on 18 April 2015, against former Russian cruiserweight champion Andrey Knyazev (11-1, 6 KOs) in Kyiv. After seven one-sided rounds, referee Mickey Vann finally stopped the fight in round eight after deciding Knyazev had taken too much punishment. This win kept Usyk on course to a WBO title fight against then champion Marco Huck.

In 29 August 2015, Usyk defeated former South African light heavyweight champion Johnny Muller via third-round TKO at the Sport Palace in Kyiv, which saw Usyk control the fight with a jab. Usyk knocked down Muller twice in round three and although Muller protested, the referee waved the fight off with one second of the round left.

Usyk made a fourth and final defense against unknown Cuban boxer Pedro Rodriguez in a scheduled 12-round fight on 12 December at the Sport Palace. Usyk won the fight scoring, his ninth straight knockout in as many fights, first dropping Rodriguez in round six with an uppercut before the fight was stopped in round seven, being knocked down again, although he beat the count. This win put Usyk at the WBO's number 1 position, with a World title fight on the cards for 2016.

WBO cruiserweight champion

Usyk vs. Głowacki
In June 2016, it was announced that Usyk would challenge undefeated Polish boxer Krzysztof Głowacki (26-0, 16 KOs) for his WBO cruiserweight title on 17 September, at the Ergo Arena, Gdansk, Poland. It was reported that Usyk's trainer James Ali Bashir wanted to recruit former world champion Antonio Tarver as a sparring partner. It was said that Tarver not only requested too much money, but also wanted to appear on the card as a co-featured main event. Głowacki weighed 199.3 pounds, with Usyk coming in slightly lighter at 198.75 pounds. The fight was shown live on Sky Sports in the UK. On the night, Usyk outpointed Głowacki after an exciting 12-round fight with the judges scoring it 119–109, 117–111, and 117–111 all in Usyk's favour. The decision win also ended Usyk's knockout streak. Usyk dominated the fight with his footwork, superior hand speed and spearing jab, injuring Głowacki's eye early in the fight, causing a cut that continued to bleed for the remainder of the contest.

Usyk vs. Mchunu
Usyk announced he would be making his American debut on the Bernard Hopkins vs. Joe Smith Jr. undercard on 17 December 2016. The fight would take place at the Forum in Inglewood, California. On 11 November K2 Promotions announced Usyk would be defending his WBO title against 28 year old South African boxer Thabiso Mchunu (17-2, 11 KOs). Mchunu previously lost to Ilunga Makabu via eleventh-round stoppage, although being ahead on the scorecards at the time. The fight started out slow, causing the fans in attendance to boo with displeasure. The pace picked up after the first couple of rounds when Usyk began breaking down Mchunu with his trademark, accurate combinations. Usyk scored a knockdown in the sixth round, and a further two more in the ninth, causing referee Lou Moret to wave off the fight at 2:53 of round 9. CompuBox statistics showed that Usyk landed 163 of 517 punches thrown (32%), and Mchunu landed 76 of his 278 (27%).

Prior to the fight, Usyk spoke of his desire to fight other cruiserweight titlists as well as fighting Anthony Joshua at heavyweight. The fight averaged 560,000 viewers on HBO: this was considered good numbers, considering it was Usyk's HBO debut and on the undercard.

Usyk vs. Hunter
K2 Promotions announced that Usyk would be returning to regular HBO to defend his cruiserweight world title in April 2017. He was originally planned to appear on the undercard of the Golovkin-Jacobs HBO PPV in March at Madison Square Garden; however, since Román González and Carlos Cuadras were scheduled to appear in separate fights and not fight each other, Usyk was pulled from the card.

On 12 February 2017, Usyk announced that he had parted ways with long time trainer James Ali Bashir and replaced him with Vasiliy Lomachenko's father and trainer, Anatoly Lomachenko. Bob Arum announced that Usyk would be part of a triple header including Vasiliy Lomachenko at the MGM National Harbor in Oxon Hill, Maryland on 8 April 2017 against Michael Hunter (12-0, 8 KOs). Usyk weighed 199.4 whilst Hunter came in at 199 pounds. In front of a sold-out crowd of 2,828, where there was majority Ukrainian fans in attendance, Usyk was taken the distance for the second time in his career and won a rather one-sided unanimous decision to retain his WBO title. Hunter unexpectedly controlled the first three rounds behind the jab. It wasn't until the fourth round, when Usyk took control of the bout using his left and connecting well to the body to win the majority of the remaining rounds. Pundits thought Hunter was gifted going the distance and the fight should have been stopped by referee Bill Clancy in the championship rounds. In the last minute of round 12, it appeared Hunter, while taking punches, was only standing because the ropes where holding him up. The referee halted the action and gave Hunter a standing eight count, ruling it a knockdown for Usyk. All three judges scored the fight unanimously 117–110 for Usyk. Although it took him a few rounds to get into the fight, Usyk was happy with his performance and called out other titleholders, "I'm very happy with my performance. I did what I wanted to do. He took a lot of punches. I thought maybe they would stop the fight (in the 12th round). I'd love to fight any of the titleholders, any time, any place."

According to CompuBox punch stats, Usyk landed 321 of his 905 punches thrown, 36%. Hunter managed to land 24% of his punches, connecting 190 of 794. The fight drew an average of 679,000 viewers on HBO and peaked at 774,000 viewers.

World Boxing Super Series

On 1 July 2015, Usyk finally announced that he would join fellow cruiserweights Mairis Briedis, Murat Gassiev, Yuniel Dorticos, Marco Huck and Krzysztof Włodarczyk in the eight-man bracket style tournament, due to start in September 2017. He said, "I feel happy and inspired with the idea of such a tournament. I've been dreaming of putting together all the champs to see who is the strongest and becomes the undisputed king of the division." The draw was to take place on 8 July in Monte Carlo. The winner of the tournament would receive a grand money prize and the Muhammad Ali trophy.

Usyk vs. Huck

At the Draft Gala, Usyk, who had first pick, chose to fight former WBO champion Marco Huck (40–4–1, 27 KOs). When asked why he chose Huck, Usyk said, "Because of my fans." Huck, who was equally excited, replied that Usyk was his 'wish opponent'. On 26 July it was announced that the fight would take place at the Max-Schmeling-Halle in Berlin on 9 September 2017. This would mark the second time Usyk would fight in Germany as a professional, having fought there in his third professional bout in April 2014. It would also mark the first fight of the tournament.

On 6 September 2017, at the final press-conference, Huck pushed Usyk in the face-off. In regards to the shove, Huck said, "I wanted to show Usyk that he is in my hometown and that he should be prepared for the battle of his life on Saturday." Usyk, who remained professional and calm, replied, "If you want to be a great champion, you have to beat the best and Huck is one of the best. I chose to enter this tournament because it is a path to achieve my dream of unifying all the belts. There’s a prestigious trophy at stake too, the Muhammad Ali Trophy. We were born on the same day and I admire Ali because he is the biggest role model in boxing and I will thank God if I win a trophy with his name on it." As he was leaving the building, Usyk claimed he would 'bury' Huck.

On fight night, Usyk used his footwork and combination punching to cruise to a TKO win. On top of his dominant performance, Usyk taunted Huck throughout the fight. In round 8, Usyk tripped on Huck's feet and Huck lost a point on the scorecards as he threw a punch at Usyk when the latter was down. Usyk continued to land combinations with little to no response from Huck until referee Robert Byrd stopped the fight in the tenth-round. With the win, Usyk progressed to the semi-final stage of the Super Series and was to face the winner of the Mairis Briedis vs. Mike Perez, scheduled for 30 September.

Usyk vs. Briedis 
Usyk would next fight Mairis Briedis (23–0, 18 KOs) following the latter's win over Perez via unanimous decision. In November 2017, it was reported the fight would take place on 27 January 2018 in Riga, Latvia, a week before Gassiev vs. Dorticos takes place. Arēna Rīga was confirmed as the location by Comosa's Chief Boxing Officer Kalle Sauerland. Usyk came in at 199.5 pounds and Briedis weighed 199.1 pounds. Usyk moved on to the final of the tournament after defeating Briedis via majority decision. With a high work rate, Usyk controlled most of the fight with his jab, applying pressure when needed. Briedis was credited with landing the harder punches. The opening four rounds were closely contested, with Usyk receiving a cut over his right eye from an accidental clash of heads in the third round. From round five, Usyk became busier and took control of the fight, although he was still hit with some hard shots to the head from Briedis. One judge scored the fight 114–114, whilst the remaining two judges scored the fight 115–113 in favour of Usyk, giving him the win. After the fight, Usyk stated it was the hardest fight of his career. According to CompuBox Stats, Usyk landed 212 of 848 punches thrown (25%) and Briedis was more accurate, landing 195 of his 579 thrown (33.7%). Usyk landed 40% of his power punches. Many boxers and pundits praised the fight.

Undisputed cruiserweight champion

Usyk vs. Gassiev 
After Usyk defeated Briedis, it was announced in the post-fight press conference that the final would take place in Jeddah, Saudi Arabia, on 11 May 2018. However, once Murat Gassiev (26-0, 19 KOs) stopped Yuniel Dorticos, setting up the final, the secretary general of the Russian Boxing Federation, Umar Kremlev, stated that he would push forward in order to outbid Saudi Arabia and have the final of the tournament take place in Russia on the Day of Russian Boxing on 22 July. On 16 April, it was reported that Usyk had suffered an elbow injury during training, pushing the final to possibly June or July 2018. On 18 June, at a press conference, Kremlev announced the final would take place on 21 July at the Olympic Stadium, Moscow, Russia. On 29 June, the final was officially confirmed. On the release date, 7,000 tickets were sold. Both boxers came in at 198.45 pounds at the weigh-in.

Usyk quickly took control of the fight, moving rapidly and using his "beautiful, commandeering jab". Usyk controlled the fight, not allowing Gassiev to use his power. Gassiev did not land a solid punch until the end of round 2. According to many reports, Usyk outclassed, outboxed, and dominated Gassiev. The result was never in question as Usyk was declared the winner by unanimous decision, with the judges’ scorecards reading 120–108, 119–109, and 119–109. Muhammad Ali's widow, Lonnie Ali, presented the trophy to Usyk. After the fight, both combatants were exemplars of good sportsmanship, embracing, with Gassiev saying "I had the best opponent of my professional career ... today is Oleksandr's day". Usyk humbly adding "My team made me look like I looked in the ring. This is our victory". The win made Usyk the first ever four-belt undisputed cruiserweight champion. Usyk dominated throughout, landing 252 of 939 thrown punches (27%), compared to Gassiev's 91 landed of 313 thrown (29%). Usyk used his superior conditioning to finish the fight, also increasing his output by landing 47 of 117 punches thrown in round 12. Usyk managed to withstand the 32 power body shots he received and continued to move around the ring.

When asked whom he would like to fight next, Usyk said, "At this time I have heard that Tony Bellew wants to fight the winner of the Muhammad Ali Trophy. I hope he will see me talking.... 'hey Tony Bellew, are you ready?' If he doesn't want to go down [in weight], I will go up [in weight] for him. I will eat more spaghetti for my dinner!" Also after the fight Usyk said: "Olympic [stadium], thanks. People, countrymen and those who supported. Moscow 2018. Bang! Daddy's in the building!".

Usyk vs. Bellew 
After calling out Tony Bellew (30-2-1, 20 KOs) after winning the tournament, Bellew responded via social media that he would accept the fight; however, he stated the fight would need to take place in 2018 and be for the undisputed cruiserweight championship. Bellew believed a fight at heavyweight would not be as appealing as he would not gain much with a win. Bellew also stated it would be his last fight as a professional. By the end of July, it was said the fight would likely take place in November 2018 in London. After positive meetings between Bellew's promoter Eddie Hearn and K2's Alexander Krassyuk, on 20 August, Boxing Scene reported the fight was likely to take place on 10 November 2018. A week later, K2 Promotions confirmed the date of the fight. On 5 September, the WBA ordered Usyk to start negotiating with Denis Lebedev (30-2, 22 KO), who was their 'champion in recess' and gave them until the first week of October 2018 to complete negotiations. There was said to be a stumbling block for the potential Usyk vs. Bellew fight. According to Hearn, the fight was likely to be pushed back to 2019. Prior to negotiations, Bellew stated the fight must happen in 2018.

On 7 September, Usyk signed a multi-fight deal with Matchroom Boxing, which meant he would fight exclusively on Sky Sports in the UK and DAZN in USA. The agreement meant Matchroom would co-promote Usyk alongside K2 Promotions. Usyk's next fight would be confirmed 'in the very near future', according to Hearn. A week after signing with Matchroom, the Usyk vs. Bellew fight was announced to take place on 10 November at the Manchester Arena, live and exclusive on Sky Box Office. Experienced British referee Terry O'Connor was named as the official. Bellew weighed 199¼ pounds, just over 2 years since he last made the cruiserweight limit and Usyk weighed 198¼ pounds.

On fight night, Usyk, who is usually a slow starter, eventually took full control of the bout and stopped Bellew in round 8 to retain all the cruiserweight belts. The official time of the stoppage was at 2:00 of round 8. There was very little action in round 1 as both boxers showed each other respect. It was a feeling out round. Due to the lack of action, the crowd began to boo towards the end of the first. Overall, Usyk landed just 3 jabs and Bellew landed 1 power shot. Round 2 was similar, however Bellew stepped on the gas, managed to land some clean shots along with some showboating. Bellew took control in round 3, landing two straight right hands. Usyk began using his jab more and after landing an overhand left, Bellew was left slightly shaken. By the end of round 4, Bellew was backed up against the ropes and looked to tire. Bellew aimed most of his shots to Usyk's body and by round 7, was missing a lot of shots, mostly due to Usyk's foot movement, and ended the round with a bloody nose. In round 8, whilst in a neutral corner, Usyk landed a hard left, again buzzing Bellew, forcing him to move away against the ropes. Another left hand wobbled Bellew before Usyk finished him off with another left, dropping Bellew backwards with his head landing on the bottom rope. A brave Bellew tried to get up slowly and beat the count but referee Terry O'Connor stopped the fight. Bellew's 10-fight winning streak came to an end. Judges Alejandro Cid and Steve Gray scored the first seven rounds 68–65 and 67–66 respectively in favour of Bellew and Yury Koptsev had the fight 67–67 entering round 8.

Afterwards, Bellew paid tribute to Usyk and announced his retirement from boxing, saying; "I have been doing this for 20 years, and it is over." Usyk stated 2018 was the most difficult year of his career, but most successful. "We need to put goals in front of us and move towards them," Usyk later stated. There was a small concern during Bellew's post-fight interview as many felt he was clearly concussed. According to compubox stats, Usyk landed 112 of his 424 punches thrown (26%) and Bellew landed 61 of his 268 thrown (23%). Both landed 47 power shots each.

Heavyweight 

After defeating Bellew, Usyk declared his intention to move up to heavyweight. Carlos Takam (36-5-1, 28 KO) was announced as his opponent, with the fight scheduled for 25 May 2019. On 7 May, it was reported that Usyk had suffered a bicep injury. The bout was rescheduled for a date in September, to be featured on DAZN. On 22 August, following the Golovkin vs. Derevyanchenko press conference, promoter Eddie Hearn revealed in an interview that Carlos Takam is "out of the fight" and "will not be taking the fight". Usyk also had the option to challenge the winner of the rematch between Andy Ruiz Jr. and Anthony Joshua for the WBA (Super), IBF, WBO and IBO heavyweight titles as the mandatory for the WBO belt, as per WBO regulations, which allow a 'super champion' of a weight class to become an immediate mandatory challenger when moving up or down in weight.

Usyk vs. Witherspoon 

In September, Usyk's heavyweight debut was announced to be on 12 October 2019, at the Wintrust Arena, Chicago, Illinois, against Tyrone Spong (14-0, 13 KOs). A few days before the fight, Spong tested positive for a banned substance, clomiphene, and the fight was thrown into disarray. Promoter Eddie Hearn said there were several backup fighters being considered. Spong's replacement was then announced as Chazz Witherspoon (38-3, 29 KOs). Usyk won the fight as Witherspoon retired in his corner after round 7.

Usyk vs. Chisora 

On 11 March 2020 it was announced that Usyk would fight former world title challenger Derek Chisora (32-9, 23 KOs) on 23 May 2020 at The O2 Arena in London. If successful, Usyk would be first in line to fight for the WBO heavyweight title held by Anthony Joshua. As part of his preparation for his bouts, Usyk sparred occasionally with former unified heavyweight champion Wladimir Klitschko. The fight was pushed back to 31 October 2020 due to the COVID-19 pandemic, and the venue was moved to the SSE Arena. On the night, Usyk used his superior footwork and stamina to wear down his opponent and win a unanimous decision victory with scores of 117–112, 115–113, 115–113. Chisora had become worn and exhausted later on in the fight, struggling to keep up with Usyk. In his post-fight interview, Usyk reiterated his desire to fight Joshua, saying "Anthony, how are you? I'm coming for you, Anthony."

Unified heavyweight champion

Usyk vs. Joshua 

Unified heavyweight champion Anthony Joshua, for whom Usyk was the WBO mandatory challenger, had been in negotiations to fight undefeated WBC and The Ring champion Tyson Fury. However, when it appeared that Fury would instead be forced to face former WBC champion Deontay Wilder in a trilogy bout due to an arbitration ruling, the WBO gave Joshua's camp 48 hours to come to an agreement for the fight with Fury on 21 May 2021, or they would instead order Joshua to face Usyk. Joshua and Fury's camps could not reach an agreement, and thus on 22 May the WBO issued the instruction that Joshua would have to fight Usyk, with an agreement for the bout to be in place by 31 May. Usyk reacted to these developments with a video message directed to Joshua's promoter Eddie Hearn, telling him, "Eddie, I want money, more money."

On 20 July, an official announcement was made, confirming that the fight between Usyk and Joshua would be taking place on 25 September at Tottenham Hotspur Stadium. Although many fans and pundits doubted Usyk would have the size or power to trouble Joshua, Usyk produced an upset, outboxing the champion and rocking him several times over 12 rounds to claim a unanimous decision victory, with scores of 117–112, 116–112 and 115–113, and retained his undefeated record. Reflecting upon his performance in his post-fight interview, Usyk said, "This means a lot for me. The fight went the way I expected it to go. There were moments when Anthony pushed me hard but it was nothing special. I had no objective to knock him out because my corner pushed me not to do that. In the beginning, I tried to hit him hard, but then I stuck to my job." On 22 June, it was announced that a rematch was scheduled to take place in Jeddah, Saudi Arabia on 20 August with Usyk defending the WBA, WBO and IBF championship belts, and Joshua, as the challenger.

Usyk vs. Joshua II 

On 29 September 2021, four days after Usyk defeated Anthony Joshua to become unified world heavyweight champion, it was announced by his promoter Alexander Krassyuk that a one-sided rematch clause which had been specified in the fight contract had "already been activated in principle, from the side of Joshua." Krassyuk noted that Usyk relished the prospect of squaring off against Joshua twice: "So I remember when we discussed with Oleksandr the issue of rematch, he was delighted and said 'Wow, cool, I will beat Antokha [sic] twice.'" Regarding the venue of the rematch, Usyk made it known that he hoped it would take place in his native country of Ukraine, saying, "I would love to have the rematch at Olimpiyskiy Stadium in Kyiv." However, Joshua's promoter, Eddie Hearn, stated that Ukraine was a "very unlikely" venue, as he wanted to maximise income: "I think it will be international or the UK, I would think it would be in the UK."

With the Russian invasion of Ukraine on 24 February 2022, a potential Usyk–Joshua rematch was thrown into doubt. In the days following the start of the invasion, Usyk posted on his social media channels to confirm that he had returned to Ukraine, and to plead with Russian President Vladimir Putin to stop the invasion, with one video captioned "NO WAR". On 2 March, Usyk confirmed in a video interview with American news network CNN that he had taken up arms and joined a territorial defence battalion in Ukraine. Regarding his professional boxing career, Usyk said, "I really don't know when I'm going to be stepping back in the ring. My country and my honour are more important to me than a championship belt." In late March, it was reported that Usyk would be leaving Ukraine to begin preparations for the rematch with Joshua. Usyk revealed his decision to leave his homeland and refocus his efforts on boxing was supported by Mayor of Kyiv and former heavyweight champion Vitali Klitschko, as well as his younger brother Wladimir Klitschko, also a former heavyweight champion who had been defeated by Anthony Joshua in 2017.

On 19 June 2022, it was officially announced that Usyk would be facing Joshua in a rematch in Jeddah, Saudi Arabia on 20 August. The fight marked the first defense of Usyk's world heavyweight titles, whilst it was Joshua's twelfth consecutive world heavyweight title fight. The fight was also an attempt by Joshua to become a three-time world heavyweight champion.

Despite Joshua's much improved performance compared to his first loss to Usyk, the latter successfully defended his belts by a split decision with one judge, Glenn Feldman, scoring the fight 115–113 to Joshua, while the other two judges scoring it 115–113 and 116–112 in Usyk's favour. The split decision was controversial as the majority of viewers expected a unanimous decision for Usyk. The Ring magazine called Glenn Feldman's scorecard "horrible". Among those criticizing his judging were promoter Lou DiBella and boxing trainer Teddy Atlas.

According to New York Times statistics, Joshua landed 37 body punches compared to 15 in their first fight. Overall, however, Usyk outperformed Joshua, landing 170 of 712 punches, compared with 124 of 492 for Joshua. According to CompuBox, Usyk established new records for punches landed by an Anthony Joshua opponent (170) and most punches landed on Joshua in a single round (39 punches in the 10th round).

Personal life
Usyk is married and has three children. They live in Kyiv, Ukraine.

His wife has Russian citizenship and the boxer uses Russian as his first language. On 28 April 2014, after the annexation of Crimea by the Russian Federation, Usyk declared he would never exchange his Ukrainian citizenship for Russian citizenship. In 2016, responding to a question if he can still enter Crimea, he stated that he often visits his family in the peninsula; that he does not like to talk politics due to the fact that people like to take words out of context, that in Russia he has many fans and that he does not divide "our peoples because we are Slavs". Afterwards, whenever pressed on the question, Usyk would often reply "Crimea belongs to God"; however in September 2022 Usyk stated that Crimea "was, is and will be" Ukrainian and that is had been taken away forcefully from Ukraine. In November, after Ukrainian Armed Forces recaptured Kherson, Usyk posted a message on his Instagram account: "Donetsk is Ukraine. Luhansk is Ukraine. Zaporizhzhia is Ukraine. Crimea is Ukraine. Kherson is Ukraine. Glory to Ukraine. Glory to ZSU".

Usyk is an Orthodox Christian. After his fight against Anthony Joshua, he said in an interview, "The only thing I wanted to do with this fight is to give praise to my Lord Jesus Christ and to say that all comes from him."

On 26 February 2022, Usyk urged Russian President Vladimir Putin to call off Russia's invasion of Ukraine that had begun on 24 February. A few days later, Usyk, fellow boxer Vasiliy Lomachenko and Bellator MMA Welterweight Champion Yaroslav Amosov travelled to Ukraine to join the country's territorial defense forces, although in late March, Usyk left Ukraine to train for his rematch with Anthony Joshua.

In preliminary negotiations for a title fight with Tyson Fury Usyk stipulated that he would only accept a 70-30 split of the purse favoring Fury if Fury agreed to making $1 million donation to
Ukraine.

Professional boxing record

Pay-per-view bouts

See also
Boxing at the 2012 Summer Olympics
List of IBF world champions
List of Olympic medalists in boxing
List of The Ring world champions
List of undisputed world boxing champions
List of WBA world champions
List of WBC world champions
List of WBO world champions
List of world cruiserweight boxing champions
List of world heavyweight boxing champions

References

External links

2006 European Championships Results
Olympic qualifier
AIBA results for Olympic qualification

1987 births
Living people
Sportspeople from Simferopol
Lviv State University of Physical Culture alumni
Dynamo sports society athletes
Ukrainian male boxers
Southpaw boxers
Olympic boxers of Ukraine
Boxers at the 2008 Summer Olympics
Boxers at the 2012 Summer Olympics
Olympic gold medalists for Ukraine
Olympic medalists in boxing
Medalists at the 2012 Summer Olympics
AIBA World Boxing Championships medalists
Middleweight boxers
Light-heavyweight boxers
World cruiserweight boxing champions
World heavyweight boxing champions
World Boxing Organization champions
World Boxing Council champions
International Boxing Federation champions
World Boxing Association champions
International Boxing Organization champions
The Ring (magazine) champions
Territorial Defense Forces of Ukraine personnel
Ukrainian military personnel of the 2022 Russian invasion of Ukraine